Muhammad Kutty Panaparambil Ismail (born 7 September 1951), is an Indian actor and film producer who works predominantly in Malayalam films. In 1972, he made his onscreen debut as an extra in K. S. Sethumadhavan's Anubhavangal Paalichakal while studying law in Maharaja's College. Since then he has acted in over 400 films in Malayalam and other languages including Tamil, Telugu, Kannada, Hindi and English films. After his debut, he appeared in an uncredited role in Kaalachakram (1973). In 1979, while he was practising law in Manjeri he was offered a pivotal role in M. T. Vasudevan Nair's Devalokam. However, this film was never released.

In 1980, Mammootty landed his first credited role in the film Vilkkanundu Swapnangal. He continued to act in minor roles in several films such as Mela (1980) and Sphodanam (1981). His first film as an independent lead actor came with I. V. Sasi's Thrishna. Then following that, he starred in lead and supporting roles. His role as Vasu in I. V. Sasi's Ahimsa won him the Kerala State Film Award for Second Best Actor. His breakthrough in Malayalam cinema came with P. G. Vishwambharan's Sandhyakku Virinja Poovu (1983). Between 1984 and 2000, he won six Filmfare Awards including two consecutive wins for the Best Actor (Malayalam). Mammootty turned producer for Adiyozhukkukal (1984), in which he played the lead role of a fisherman back from jail. The film was produced under the "Casino Films" banner.

Mammootty debuted in Tamil cinema with Mounam Sammadham (1989). While he made his Telugu film debut with Swathi Kiranam (1992). He made his Bollywood debut in the same year with Dhartiputra. He won 3 National Film Awards, 7 Kerala State Film Awards and 11 Filmfare Awards South. His 2010 film Kutty Srank won the National Film Award for Best Feature Film, while his 2006 film Karutha Pakshikal won the National Film Award for Best Film on Family Welfare. In 1998, the government of India honoured him with its fourth highest civilian award, Padma Shri for his contribution to the Indian film industry. He was conferred with the Doctor of Letters degree by the University of Calicut and the University of Kerala in 2010. In 2005, Asianet called him "The greatest method actor to grace Indian cinema." He has starred in both art house and blockbuster films.

Films in Malayalam

Other languages

Narrator / voice-over

Unreleased films

Television

See also
 List of awards and nominations received by Mammootty

Notes

References

Indian filmographies
Male actor filmographies